Anton Sergeyevich Troianovski (born 30 May 1985) is a Soviet-born American journalist, Moscow bureau chief for The New York Times and former Moscow bureau chief for The Washington Post.

Early life 
Anton Troianovski was born on 30 May 1985 in Moscow, Soviet Union, into a family of biologists. His father is Sergey Markovich Troianovski, son of the Soviet film director and cameraman . In 1990, Troianovski's family moved to Heidelberg, Germany, and in 1994 they moved to the United States.

Career 
His career began as a photographer for the Webster-Kirkwood Times and the Suburban Journals group in Missouri, US. In June 2008, he graduated from Harvard University with a bachelor's degree in social studies. While at university, he was Associate Managing Editor of The Harvard Crimson newspaper. In 2007, Troianovski received a travel grant from the Davis Center for Russian and Eurasian Studies for his topic "The New Generation of Russian Journalists after the Fall of Communism". He was an intern at The New Republic, Associated Press and The Washington Post.

Since 2008, he has worked for The Wall Street Journal, where he covered topics related to real estate, telecommunications and the economy in Washington and New York City. From 2013 to 2017 he worked as a correspondent in Berlin, Germany.

From January 2018 to July 2019, he worked as the Moscow bureau chief for The Washington Post. Troianovski was part of The Post's 2020 Pulitzer Prize-winning team for its climate change reporting series.

On 27 June 2019, he joined The New York Times, where he has been the Moscow bureau chief since January 2021. He was one of the first foreign journalists who covered the events during the 2020 Nagorno-Karabakh war.

Troianovski speaks English, Russian, German and French.

References 

Living people
Harvard University alumni
The New York Times writers
The Washington Post journalists
American war correspondents
1985 births
The Wall Street Journal people
The New Republic people
Associated Press reporters
Russian emigrants to the United States